Vachellia caven var. caven is a perennial tree native to South America.

References

External links
Aronson J. 1992. Evolutionary Biology of Acacia caven (Leguminosae, Mimosoideae): Infraspecific Variation in Fruit and Seed Characters. Annals of the Missouri Botanical Garden 79, 958-968

caven var. caven